The 2008 Oceania Swimming Championships were held in New Zealand and featured competition in swimming, open water swimming and synchronized swimming. It was the 7th Oceania Swimming Championships and second time that New Zealand hosted the event after playing host to the 2000 Championships.

The open water competitions were held from 3 February to 5 February near Rotorua in Lake Okataina and Lake Rotoma whilst the swimming and synchronized swimming competitions were carried out from 5 June to 8 June in Christchurch at the QEII Leisure Centre.

Twelve of the 13 federated members of the Oceania Swimming Association competed with the Northern Mariana Islands the only member not to send any swimmers. Two associate members also attending, bringing the total to 14: the French overseas department New Caledonia and the USA State Hawaii.

Medal Tally
The ranking sorts by the number of gold medals earned by a member federation (or associate member) of the Oceania Swimming Association. The number of silver medals is taken into consideration next and then the number of bronze medals. If, after the above, countries are still tied, equal ranking is given and they are listed alphabetically. The host country, New Zealand, is highlighted in lavender. The greatest number of medals won in each medal category, gold, silver, bronze, and total, is in boldface.

Swimming 
A total of 38 swimming events were contested in a 50-metre pool. To give the smaller island nations a chance against the stronger swimming nations of Australia and New Zealand the championships rules stated that in the individual events only the top two qualifiers from each country progress through to the final with the third fastest swimmer only from those countries with two swimmers qualifying for the ‘A’ final permitted to swim in the ‘B’ final. In the relay events it was one medal per country. So, for example, if New Zealand 'A' finishes first, Australia 'A' finishes second, New Zealand 'B' finishes third and New Caledonia finishes fourth, New Caledonia would be awarded the bronze medal.

Key 
 CR - Championship record
 NR - National record

Men's events

Women's events

Open Water Swimming

Men's events

Women's events

Synchronized Swimming

Records broken 
During the 2008 Oceania Swimming Championships, 42 Championship Records (or Meet Records) were set. Multiple Continental and National Records were also set.

Championship records 
 Men's 50 m freestyle - Mark Herring  (22.96) (heats)
 Men's 50 m freestyle - Mark Herring  (22.92) (final)
 Men's 50 m freestyle - William Benson  (22.92) (final)
 Men's 50 m freestyle - Orinoco Faamausili-Banse  (22.86) (B final)
 Men's 100 m freestyle - Reese Turner  (50.61) (heats)
 Men's 100 m freestyle - Cameron Gibson  (50.36) (heats)
 Men's 100 m freestyle - Mark Herring  (49.83) (heats)
 Men's 200 m freestyle - Robert Hurley  (1:49.62) (heats)
 Men's 200 m freestyle - Robert Hurley  (1:48.84) (final)
 Men's 400 m freestyle - Robert Hurley  (3:53.56) (final)
 Men's 1500 m freestyle - Theodore Pasialis  (15:27.31) (timed final)
 Men's 50 m backstroke - Daniel Bell  (26.45) (heats)
 Men's 50 m backstroke - Robert Hurley  (25.64) (final)
 Men's 100 m backstroke - Robert Hurley  (55.04) (final)
 Men's 100 m backstroke - Robert Hurley  (54.91) (relay)
 Men's 200 m backstroke - Robert Hurley  (2:01.23) (final)
 Men's 50 m breaststroke - Glenn Snyders  (28.31) (final)
 Men's 200 m breaststroke - Glenn Snyders  (2:16.24) (final)
 Men's 50 m butterfly - Corney Swanepoel  (23.98) (final)
 Men's 100 m butterfly - Ryan Pini  (52.33) (final)
 Men's 200 m butterfly - Moss Burmester  (1:58.00) (final)
 Men's 200 m individual medley - Dean Kent  (2:02.21) (final)
 Men's 4×100 m freestyle relay - Mark Herring, Orinoco Faamausili-Banse, William Benson, Cameron Gibson  (3:19.91) (timed final)
 Men's 4×200 m freestyle relay - Ryan Napoleon, Reece Turner, Theodore Pasialis, Robert Hurley  (7:25.63) (timed final)
 Men's 4×100 m medley relay - Daniel Bell, Glenn Snyders, Corney Swanepoel, Cameron Gibson  (3:38.62) (timed final)
 Women's 50 m freestyle - Rebecca Ohlwein  (26.01) (heats)
 Women's 50 m freestyle - Rebecca Ohlwein  (25.84) (final)
 Women's 100 m freestyle - Hayley Palmer  (55.55) (heats)
 Women's 100 m freestyle - Hayley Palmer  (55.55) (final)
 Women's 200 m freestyle - Helen Norfolk  (2:00.31) (final)
 Women's 50 m backstroke - Elizabeth Coster  (29.08) (heats)
 Women's 50 m backstroke - Elizabeth Coster  (28.89) (final)
 Women's 100 m backstroke - Elizabeth Coster  (1:02.19) (heats)
 Women's 100 m backstroke - Elizabeth Coster  (1:01.10) (final)
 Women's 200 m backstroke - Melissa Ingram  (2:11.03) (timed final)
 Women's 50 m breaststroke - Jessica Legge  (32.22) (timed final)
 Women's 100 m butterfly - Amy Smith  (59.96) (final)
 Women's 200 m butterfly - Amy Smith  (2:09.63) (final)
 Women's 200 m individual medley - Helen Norfolk  (2:14.74) (final)
 Women's 400 m individual medley - Helen Norfolk  (4:47.32) (timed final)
 Women's 4×200 m freestyle relay - Helen Norfolk, Lauren Boyle, Hayley Palmer, Tash Hind  (8:10.78) (timed final)
 Women's 4×100 m medley relay - Bridgette-Rose Taylor, Jessica Legge, Amy Smith, Olivia Halicek  (4:09.14) (timed final)

See also
 Oceania Swimming Championship records

External links
 Championship information on Swimming New Zealand site
 Full results (pdf)

Oceania Swimming Championships, 2008
Oceania Swimming Championships, 2008
Swimming competitions in New Zealand
Oceania Swimming Championships, 2008
Oceania Swimming Championships, 2008
Oceania Swimming Championships
International aquatics competitions hosted by New Zealand
February 2008 sports events in New Zealand
June 2008 sports events in New Zealand